Laurence Barry Murphy (born 10 February 1940) is an English former footballer who played in the Football League for Barnsley and is their record appearance holder with 569.

In his retirement, Murphy has become a regular special guest at Barnsley and is often the host for their many charitable events.

Career

Barry Murphy joined Barnsley from South Shields in 1962. He made his debut in the same year against Halifax, losing 2–0.

"Spud" was the first Barnsley player to be used as a substitute in October 1965 when he replaced Brian Jackson in a 5–1 defeat at Doncaster Rovers.

After earning his first-team status, Murphy went on to make a consecutive run of 165 league and 17 cup games. He was voted Barnsley's player of the year in 1972, and after the emergence of two other young full-backs he took on a central defensive role in 1974–75 under Jim Iley when he was also made captain.

In November 1975 he was appointed player-coach aged 35 years and was restored to his former right-back role and was an ever-present during the 1976–77 season. He made his final appearance aged 38 years in April 1978 against Torquay Utd.

Barry continued on the Reds' coaching staff under Allan Clarke and joined him at Leeds United in October 1980.

Barry coached at Leeds United until 1984.

Honours 

 Barnsley Hall of Fame

References

External links
 Barry Murphy stats at Neil Brown stat site
 Barry Murphy article

English footballers
English Football League players
Barnsley F.C. players
1940 births
Living people
Association football fullbacks
Sportspeople from Consett
Footballers from County Durham
South Shields F.C. (1936) players